Mary McCracken may refer to:
 Mary Ann McCracken, social activist and campaigner in Belfast, Ireland
 Mary Elizabeth McCracken, medical missionary
 Mary Isabel McCracken, American entomologist, researcher and teacher